Archives of Pharmacal Research is a bimonthly, peer-reviewed medical journal covering research on pharmacology. It was established in 1976 and is published by Springer Science+Business Media on behalf of the Pharmaceutical Society of Korea, of which it is the official journal. The editor-in-chief is Seok-Yong Lee (Sungkyunkwan University). According to the Journal Citation Reports, the journal has a 2020 impact factor of 4.946.

References

External links

Publications established in 1976
Bimonthly journals
Springer Science+Business Media academic journals
English-language journals